"Chitty Chitty Death Bang" is the third episode of the first season of the animated comedy series Family Guy. It was originally shown on Fox in the United States on April 18, 1999. The episode follows Peter after he tries to make amends for his son, Stewie's, first birthday party when he loses their reservation at a popular kids' restaurant known as Cheesie Charlie's. Meanwhile, Meg becomes friends with an excitable girl named Jennifer, who leads her to join a death cult (inspired from the 1997 Heaven's Gate mass suicide), in an attempt to fit in.

The episode was written by Danny Smith and directed by Dominic Polcino, both firsts in the Family Guy series. The episode featured guest performances by Butch Hartman, Waylon Jennings, Rachael MacFarlane and John O'Hurley, along with several recurring voice actors for the series. Much of the episode features a cutaway style of humor that is typically used in Family Guy, many of which feature cultural references including the Incredible Hulk, The Dukes of Hazzard, Three Little Pigs, and Couplehood.

The title "Chitty Chitty Death Bang" is a variation on that of the 1968 musical film, Chitty Chitty Bang Bang.

Plot
Lois has booked Cheesie Charlie's for Stewie's upcoming first birthday party and sends Peter, along with Chris, to drop off the deposit check at the restaurant. However, once they arrive, they seek the opportunity to play with all the machines, causing Peter to lose his watch in a claw machine. A little boy wins his watch, which causes Peter to become angry and tries to force the watch off the child. Five minutes later, the manager sees this and asks Peter to leave. But once Peter shows the deposit check, he immediately apologizes and exclaims how they are very excited to host Stewie's birthday party. Peter, angered by how he was treated, states that they will not be celebrating Stewie's party there, which causes a crowd of people to circle around the manager shouting for the reservation. Peter, realizing what he has just done, immediately returns home with a poorly crafted lie in an attempt to evade Lois' aggravation, which involves him saying that they are Nazis who torture, kill and kidnap people. He pretends that he has already planned an extravagant party at home so that Lois does not have to do any work.

Meanwhile, Stewie misinterprets the meaning of his birthday and assumes that the same mysterious "Man in White" who delivered him as an infant will be returning to force Stewie back into Lois' womb, from which he escaped just one year ago. Meg cries all the way home to Peter from cheerleading practice, and has been having trouble fitting in at school. Later, she discovers a new friend named Jennifer. Meanwhile, Stewie makes it all the way to the airport looking for tickets, but then is stopped by a member of staff. The man then gives Stewie some advice, saying that running from your problems never solves anything. Stewie then reflects on this, deciding to finally face "The Man in White". But before he leaves, he wishes the man luck before freezing him in carbonite.
Peter tries desperately, but ultimately unsuccessfully, to put together a party in time for Stewie's birthday. He finally reroutes a circus into the Griffins' backyard, saving the day - that is, until he reveals to Lois that he gave Meg permission to go to a party at her friend's house. Lois, who wanted the whole family together for Stewie's party, is upset with Peter for letting Meg go. What Peter and Lois do not realize is that Meg's "party" is actually a cult meeting where all the members are about to commit group suicide.

Peter goes to retrieve Meg from her "party" and asks Meg to come as Lois wants her there. Meg just says it is just a birthday party and asks who would remember if she was not there. Peter says that Lois would, as she remembers everything, and that her best memories are of when Meg and her brothers were born. He then has an epiphany: having the entire family at the party is more for Lois than Stewie. Realizing how terrible she has been, Meg agrees to come home, and the cult members agree as well. Peter makes a toast, then looks at his watch before he can drink the poisoned punch and pulls Meg out before she can drink hers, oblivious to the fact that he is saving her life in the process while the cult members all die. The cult leader chases after them while wearing his ceremonial white robe and is mistaken by Stewie as "The Man in White". Stewie does away with him and, feeling victorious, joins the others to enjoy his party.

Production

"Chitty Chitty Death Bang" was written by Danny Smith and directed by Dominic Polcino, both their first episodes in the Family Guy series. Staff writers included voice actor Mike Henry and Andrew Gormley, while Ricky Blitt, Chris Sheridan as executive story editors, and Neil Goldman and Garrett Donovan acted as the story editors. To help Polcino direct the episode were supervising directors Peter Shin and Roy Allen Smith.

In addition to the regular cast, guest stars included actor and comedian Patrick Bristow, animator, executive producer, animation director, storyboard artist and producer Butch Hartman (who played Mr. Weed, Peter's boss, and various other characters), writer Gary Janetti (who played the Demon and Riff), actor John O'Hurley (who played the Cult Leader), and Waylon Jennings (who played himself). Recurring cast members included Mike Henry who played Cleveland Brown and Lori Alan who played Dianne Simons. This is the first episode Seth MacFarlane's sister, Rachael MacFarlane guest starred in the episode as the voice of Jennifer. In future episodes, she would become a recurring voice actor for the series. Rachel has noted that she was asked by Seth to lend her voice for the show, but she did have to audition for the role.

As with the remaining first four episodes of the season, the title of the episode, "Chitty Chitty Death Bang", was derived from 1930s and 1940s radio programs, particularly the radio thriller anthology "Suspense", which featured several elements pertaining to death and murder. This convention was later dropped following the fifth episode of the season, "A Hero Sits Next Door". due to individual episodes becoming difficult to identify and distinguish.

Cultural references
When Peter explains to Lois why he canceled the party at Cheesie Charlie's, he said he had been kidnapped by them and that they are Nazis. He explains to Lois that he escaped by turning into the Incredible Hulk.

The place where Lois had planned Stewie's birthday party is called Cheesie Charlie's, which is a reference to the food chain Chuck E. Cheese's.

When Stewie recalls how he was conceived, he tells the story of which he was in a sperm ship and gets into a fight with other sperm ships is a reference to fights in the Star Wars trilogy.

Peter loses his Dukes of Hazzard watch.

When Peter is looking for pigs for a petting zoo he takes down a house of straw and a house made of sticks, this is a reference to the fairy tale Three Little Pigs.

Peter is also struck in the head by a paint can on a string, a reference to the film Home Alone.

Items added to the suicide cult punch mix by Jennifer include cyanide, arsenic, rat poison, and the book Couplehood by Paul Reiser.

The episode title is a reference to the 1968 musical film, Chitty Chitty Bang Bang.

Reception
A 2008 review of the episode written by Ahsan Haque of IGN was generally positive; Haque stated that while he did not believe "Chitty Chitty Death Bang" was an "instant classic", it has "plenty of memorable moments" and "a nicely crafted storyline". Haque went on to praise Peter's attempt to "convince  that the people at Cheesie Charlie's are Nazi devils who kidnapped him and that he only manages to escape because he was able to turn into the Incredible Hulk", as well as Stewie's role in the episode, calling it "extremely clever". Haque concluded his review by rating the episode an 8.4/10. David Williams from the DVD Movie Guide said that this and other episodes of the first season did a marvelous job of introducing the characters of the series to the viewers.

In his review of "Chitty Chitty Death Bang" the TV Critic called the writing in the episode wittier than in previous ones. He found the Stewie storyline very enjoyable, and also commented positively on the moral of the story. He criticized the Meg storyline as he did not find mass suicide funny; he also commented that Peter felt a lot like Homer from The Simpsons. In his final comments he said it had some odd moments but it was a fun story.

References

External links

 

Family Guy (season 1) episodes
1999 American television episodes
Fiction about cults
Heaven's Gate (religious group)
Television episodes directed by Dominic Polcino